The Moscow Police, officially the Main Directorate of Internal Affairs of the City of Moscow, is the police force for Moscow, Russia.

The Moscow Police is the largest regional police force in Russia with 50,500 officers as of 2010, with primary responsibilities in law enforcement, the detection and investigation of crime, and protection of the public order in the Federal City of Moscow. It is part of the Ministry of Internal Affairs (MVD) and also subordinate to Moscow City Duma, with its headquarters located at 38 Petrovka Street in Tverskoy District, Moscow. Moscow Police is headed by the Chief appointed by the President of Russia, on the recommendation of the Minister of Internal Affairs, based on a nomination of the Mayor of Moscow. Oleg Baranov is the acting police chief who was appointed September 23, 2016.

The Moscow Police was established in 1722, and is one of the oldest police forces in Russia and the world. During the Soviet era, the service was known as the Moscow Municipal Militsiya (Russian: Муниципальная милиция, Москва) until 2011, when it was given its current name by then-President Dmitry Medvedev in the Russian police reform.

History

The first municipal police in Moscow was established on January 19, 1722, during the reign of Peter I.

On October 28, 1917, by the direction of People's Commissars, was issued a decree On the workers as the new Soviet police. The workers' militia was renamed to the Soviet of Workers' and Soldiers' Deputies militia.

In 1946, a law was passed that transformed the Council of People's Commissars into the Council of Ministers, coinciding with the reorganization of the People's Committee of Internal Affairs into the Ministry of Interior, respectively, the city committee of the NKVD was reorganized into the Office of Internal Affairs.

In 1973, the Office of Internal Affairs of Moscow City was transformed into the Main Department of Internal Affairs (GUVD), and regional offices - in the Interior Department.

In 2011, the Militsiya became the Politsiya (Полиция) as the Russian police reform initiated by President Dmitry Medvedev began to improve the efficiency of Russia's police forces. In addition, he ordered the resignation of certain high-ranking police officers.

Structure

1st Operational Regiment (mounted police) 
The First Operational Regiment (mounted police) is responsible for patrolling parks, preventing crime and maintaining order at public events (invasion, and other major music and sporting events). In the "mounted police" in Moscow are about 1,000 policemen and 255 horses.

The HQ Located on Airport Street, Viktorenko 10.

2nd Regiment of operational police 
Two operational regiment of militia police in Moscow - formed in 2004 merging the three regiments of militsiya (now police) operating in Moscow, responsible for patrol services. The main task is to ensure public order during mass events in Moscow. Also, staff of the 2nd Regiment of operational police are devoted to power support various departments of the criminal police.
 
The unit reports directly to the police leadership and the Moscow Police Directorate of public order Directorate for Public Order (UOOP). It is the second largest unit in the Moscow Police after the Moscow riot police.

Zonal center for dogs trainers 
Zonal dog service center - is the largest center for the training of dogs in Moscow. Dogs are trained for different purposes: search for narcotics, explosives, firearms and the search for the detention. The dogs are in the nursery not far from Moscow in two-story cages, separated by areas of work. Dogs who are seeking weapons of living apart from the dogs involved in detention. Used breeds - German Shepherd, Giant Schnauzer, Doberman, Labrador, Setter, and others.

The center is located in Veterinary part, a platform for training at the detention area for training to find explosives, Veterinary part, "maternity hospital" and "Kindergarten" and "nursing home" for dogs who retired. On the one dog running a dog specialist. They work all their lives together.

MUR 
Moscow Criminal Investigations Department is a division of the Main Department of Internal Affairs in Moscow. It includes the  Criminal Investigation Department of the Moscow police and the criminal investigation division of district and municipal law enforcement agencies. The head of the department is Oleg Baranov (since 2011).

The Moscow CID's roots are from the Moscow detective prikaz of the Grand Duchy of Moscow, which was established in 1619, replacing the interrogation mission ( established in 1763.

In 1782 the Bureau of Criminal Affairs (Палата уголовных дел) was established and it was the Moscow department of the Russian gendarmerie.

Divisions

Directorate for Public Order 
Directorate for Public Order. Managing the maintenance of public order in Moscow. Head of Department - Colonel Alexander D. Blagov. 
Main Purposes:
 Organization of the patrol service orders;
 Organization to ensure security for the cultural and socio-political activities;
 Organization to ensure safety during sports activities.

Riot Police unit 

On October 23, 1987 on the basis of the 2nd Regiment patrol by the order of USSR Interior Ministry was created a special police squad assignment - OMON. The main tasks - providing security for the various events, saving lives during emergencies and disasters and epidemiological aggravations, etc.

Moscow City Police Commissioners 

The Moscow City Police Commissioner (Officially Head of Internal Affairs of Moscow) is the head of the Moscow City Police. The Commissioner is appointed by the Mayor of Moscow, and serves at the Mayor's pleasure. The Commissioner is responsible for the day-to-day operation of the department as well as the appointment of deputies and subordinate officers. The Commissioner is a policeman administrator appointed by the Governor of Saint Petersburg, after the approvement of the Moscow City Duma, by recommendation of the President of Russia. There is a separate position of Chief of Police, the holder of which serves as the Deputy to the Head of Internal Affairs.

The current Commissioner is Oleg Baranov, who was appointed by Mayor Sergey Sobyanin and took office on 23 September 2016. The longest serving Commissioner are Nikolai Arapov and Lev Tsinskiy who served for 12 years (1866-1878 and .1833-1845, respectively).

Oberpolizmeister 
Maxim Grekov (1722–1728)
Ivan Pozdnyakov (1729–1731)
Stepan Grekov (1731–1732)
Nikita Obloduev (1733–1739)
Ivan Golokhvastov (1749–1753)
Ivan Divov (1792)
Ivan Yushkov (1762–1764)
Taras Arseniev (1764–1765)
Vasily Tolstoy (1765–1770)
Nikolay Bakhmetev (1770–1771)
Nikolai Arkharov (1771–1781)
Boris Ostrovskiy (1781–1785)
Feodor Tol (1785–1790)
Pavel Glazov (1790–1793)
Pavel Kozlov (1793–1796)
Pavel Kaverin (1797–1798; 1801–1802)
Feodor Ertel (1798–1801)
Grigory Spiridov (1802–1804)
Aleksander Balashov (1804–1807)
Ivan Gladkov (1807–1809)
Pyotr Ivashkin (1809–1816)
Aleksander Shulgin (1816–1825)
Dmitry Shulgin (1825–1830)
Sergei Mukhanov (1830–1833)
Lev Tsinskiy (1833–1845)
Ivan Luzhin (1845–1854)
Alexey Timasshev-Bering (1854–1857)
Alexey Kropotkin (1858–1860)
Aleksander Potapov (1860–1861)
Heinrich Kreiz (1861–1866)
Nikolai Arapov (1866–1878)
Aleksander Kozlov (1878–1881; 1882–1887)
Evgeniy Yankovskiy (1881–1882)
Evgeniy Yurkovskiy (1887–1891)
Alexander Vlasovskiy (1891–1896)
Dmitry Trepov (1896–1905)
Nikolai Arkharov (1775–1782)

Heads of Internal affairs of Moscow City Committee 
 Samokhvalov Vadim G. (1973 - September 1979)
 Trushin Vasily Petrovich (1979 - January 1984)
 Borisenkov Vladimir G. (1984 - August 1986)
 Peter S. Bogdanov (1986 - April 1991)
 Myrikov Nikolai Stepanovich (April - September 1991)

Heads of the Moscow Internal Affairs Main Dept. 
 Murashev Arkady (September 1991 - November 9, 1992)
 Pankratov, Vladimir I. (1991 - 2 March 1995)
 Kulikov Nikolay (1995 - December 4, 1999)
 Shvidkin Viktor Andreevich (1999–2001)
 Vladimir Pronin (July 24, 2001 - April 28, 2009)
 Ivanov, Alexander Kuzmich (April 4, 2009 - September 7, 2009)
 Vladimir Kolokoltsev (September 7, 2009 - March 24, 2011).

Moscow Police Commissioner 
 Vladimir Kolokoltsev (March 24, 2011 - May 21, 2012)
 Viktor Golovanov (Acting; May 21 - June 2, 2012)
 Anatoly Yakunin (Since June 2, 2012 - September 23, 2016)
 Oleg Baranov (Since September 23, 2016)

Gallery

See also 
 :Category:Fictional portrayals of the Moscow City Police
 Police of Russia
 Saint Petersburg Police
 Militsiya

References

External links

Police Commissioner page on the Moscow Police website
 

 
Organizations based in Moscow
Organizations established in 1772
Law enforcement agencies of Russia